Herman Zetterberg (1 July 1904 – 18 March 1963) was a Swedish jurist and politician of the Social Democratic Party who served as justice minister for twelve years between July 1945 and September 1957.

Early life and education
Zetterberg was born on 1 July 1904 in Uddevalla. His parents were the court of appeal councilor Hugo Zetterberg and Alma Rehnberg.

He graduated with a law degree from Uppsala University in 1928.

Career
Zetterberg was an appellate court counsel in 1942 and served as a member of the law committee 1944–1947. On 31 July 1945, he was appointed justice minister to the cabinet led by Prime Minister Per Albin Hansson. He held this post until 30 September 1957. During his tenure Zetterberg took an anti-Soviet approach. From 1957 to his death in 1963, he was president of the Svea Court of Appeal.

Personal life and death
Zetterberg married twice. His first wife, Kitty Rippe, died of cancer in 1955. He remarried in 1959 to Ulrica Lyttkens, who died in January 1963. Zetterberg died on 18 March 1963.

References

External links

20th-century jurists
1904 births
1963 deaths
Swedish jurists
Swedish Ministers for Justice
Uppsala University alumni
People from Uddevalla Municipality